Screamin' Eagle is a wooden roller coaster located at Six Flags St. Louis in Eureka, Missouri. The ride is a modified 'L'-Shaped Out And Back. The Screamin' Eagle was manufactured by the Philadelphia Toboggan Coasters and was the last coaster designed by John Allen, who was a designer of roller coasters. Allen believed a coaster should inspire awe, not only from a ride full of thrills, but also from its magnificent beauty. Originally Allen wanted to design a coaster to replace the Comet at Forest Park Highlands, but lack of funds prevented him from doing such. The Screamin' Eagle is reminiscent of the Comet, mirroring its L-shape, but to a much larger scale.

Renovations
In 1990, the trains were replaced, the turns banked and a double up hill was removed from a section of the track. From 2003-2006 the Screamin’ Eagle received significant repairs such as painting, re-tracking and replacing of the control panel.

Awards

 Designated by the American Coaster Enthusiasts a "Coaster Landmark" on June 21, 2016

References

External links
Screamin' Eagle at Six Flags St. Louis Official Page
Guinness World Records Web Site
Six Flags Timeline

Roller coasters operated by Six Flags
Six Flags St. Louis
Roller coasters in Missouri
Roller coasters introduced in 1976